Stalettì is a town and comune in the province of Catanzaro in the Calabria region of southern Italy.

Geography
The town is bordered by Montauro and Squillace. It has a very well-rounded landscape, including beautiful beaches in the Caminia, Copanello, and Pietragrande frazioni, as well as hills and mountains.

There are many farms, as well, with the predominant export being olives and olive oil.

There is limited road access connecting the upper and lower sections of Stalettì, and it has rendered difficult particularly in moments of need, such as fires and other emergencies.

Notes and references

Guida storico-turistica di Stalettì by Rosario Casalenuovo (Archeoclub d'Italia, Rome 1996)
Il monastero Vivariense di Cassiodoro: ricognizione e ricerche, 1994-1999

External links
 The fountain of Cassiodorus. With the nearby Casino Pepe, one of the best-hidden historical treasures of Stalettì.
 La fontana di Cassiodoro. Versione italiana di "The Fountain of Cassiodorus".

Cities and towns in Calabria